Fields Creek is a stream in the U.S. state of West Virginia. It is a tributary of Kanawha River.

Fields Creek was named after Colonel John Fields, a pioneer soldier.

Fields Creek was the site of a February 2014 coal slurry spill from a Patriot Coal facility.

See also
List of rivers of West Virginia

References

Rivers of Kanawha County, West Virginia
Rivers of West Virginia